"Frontin" is the debut single by American musician Pharrell Williams featuring fellow American rapper Jay-Z. It was written by the artists alongside Chad Hugo, who produced it with Williams as the Neptunes. At the time of its release, Williams insisted the single was a one-off, and that he was purely a producer and not an artist in his own right. However, he released his own solo studio album, In My Mind, in 2006.

The song's title refers to putting up a facade (or false 'front'), typically to impress peers. It was the 34th best-selling song of 2003 in the U.S., according to Billboard magazine. It was also featured on The Neptunes' 2003 compilation album The Neptunes Present... Clones, which debuted at number one on the Billboard 200 in August 2003. The video features a 17-year old Lauren London as Pharrell's love interest.

The drum beat was heavily influenced by the Beatles 1965 track "In My Life", and the bass during the bridge by Stevie Wonder. Pharrell had initially written the song for Prince.

Music video
The music video was filmed in Miami, Florida.

Chart performance
"Frontin'"  peaked at number five on the Billboard Hot 100. It also peaked at number one on the Hot R&B/Hip-Hop Songs. In the UK, the song also charted inside the top 10, peaking at number six in the UK Singles Chart and spending 10 weeks within the top 75. It was Pharrell's biggest solo hit until 2013's "Happy" (his biggest hit as a collaboration being "Blurred Lines" with Robin Thicke and T.I.).

Track listing
UK CD single
 "Frontin'" 
 "Hot Damn" 
 "Popular Thug" 
 "Frontin'"

Charts

Weekly charts

Year-end charts

Jamie Cullum version
On February 11, 2004, the track was covered by British neo-jazz artist Jamie Cullum for BBC Radio 1's Live Lounge. Williams was very impressed by the cover after it was played to him on a visit to the show, and this led to Cullum providing backup vocals for "You Can Do It Too", a track on Pharrell's first solo album In My Mind. The cover appeared as a bonus track on the US release of Cullum's album Twentysomething. Cullum's version was released as a single and reached number 12 in the UK.

Other versions
"Frontin'" was also covered live by Maroon 5, featuring Chad Hugo and rapper Mos Def, who replaced Jay-Z's verse with impromptu rapping from A Tribe Called Quest's "Bonita Applebum", in an apparent reference to similarities between parts of the tracks. New Orleans native Trombone Shorty and his band and Orleans Avenue cover the song on their 2005 debut album, Orleans & Claiborne. During the 2012 International Yardfest at Howard University, American singer Leah LaBelle performed her 2012 single "Sexify" as part of a medley with "Frontin'". In 2014, UK garage group Disclosure remixed the song.

American rapper Goldlink also performed a live cover of the song on Like a Version.

References

2003 songs
2003 debut singles
Jay-Z songs
Pharrell Williams songs
Jamie Cullum songs
Music videos directed by Paul Hunter (director)
Song recordings produced by the Neptunes
Songs written by Pharrell Williams
Songs written by Chad Hugo
Songs written by Jay-Z
Star Trak Entertainment singles
Arista Records singles